Waru or WARU may refer to:

Arts
Waru (2006 film), a 2006 film directed by Takashi Miike
Waru (2017 film), a 2017 New Zealand film
Waru: kanketsu-hen, a 2006 sequel film by Takashi Miike
 Waru (manga), a manga by Jun Fukami

Locations
Waru, Pamekasan, in Pamekasan Regency, East Java
Waru, Penajam North Paser, in Penajam North Paser Regency, East Kalimantan
Waru, Sidoarjo, in Sidoarjo Regency, East Java
 Waru railway station, railway station in Waru, Sidoarjo Regency

Radio stations
 WARU (AM), a defunct radio station (1600 AM) formerly licensed to Peru, Indiana, United States
 WARU-FM, a radio station (101.9 FM) licensed to Roann, Indiana

Other uses
Waru warn, a native South American agricultural method
Waru, Indonesian name for Hibiscus tiliaceus